Throughout history, numerous members of royal and noble houses have engaged in same-sex relationships. However, even in jurisdictions where homosexuality was not prohibited or proscribed by law or religious edicts, titles of aristocracy were almost always directly transferred through married spouses of the opposite sex and their offspring (except when certain titles could be inherited by relatives upon a childless death). Nevertheless, queer relationships occurred before, during, and outside such arrangements, as romance and marriage have widely historically been seen as two very different things.

It is important to note that the terms 'homosexuality' and 'heterosexuality' did not exist until the late 19th century. For much of human history, most societies around the world did not view sexuality in modern binary terms. Indeed, many of these cultures have variously tolerated, acknowledged, accepted, and celebrated diverse sexualities and genders since ancient times, long before widespread Western colonization and imperialism, and the Christian influence, homophobia, and transphobia that came along with it. In any case, widespread historical acceptance of queerness is reflected in LGBT history around the world, including that of heads of state.

History

Ancient and medieval times

Ancient Rome
A number of Roman rulers had homosexual relationships, including the Emperor Trajan, the Emperor Hadrian and his lover Antinous, and the Emperor Elagabalus.

Imperial China

Several Chinese emperors had openly homosexual relationships. A famous example is that of Emperor Ai of Han and his lover, Dong Xian, whom Ai promoted quickly through government ranks and ennobled as a marquess (this despite the fact that both men were legally married to women).

Throughout written Chinese history, the role of women is given little positive emphasis, with relationships between women being especially rare. One mention by Ying Shao, who lived about 140 to 206, does relate palace women attaching themselves as husband and wife, a relationship called dui shi. He noted, "They are intensely jealous of each other."

Europe

In many European countries, same-sex relations have historically been stigmatized, illegal, or considered sinful by Christians. Sometimes charges of homosexual relations were propagated by enemies, often rumors of such activities were denied, and sometimes same-sex lovers were acknowledged openly.

Since the Parliament of the United Kingdom enacted a series of reforms (from the 1960s onward) to the honours system, few hereditary titles have been created (the last being created in 1990), while life peerages have proliferated, allowing for more openly LGBT persons to be appointed to the House of Lords. However, despite the legalization of civil partnerships for same-sex couples in 2004, spouses of ennobled civil partners have not been allowed the extension of title and privilege from their spouses' ennoblements as those accorded to married opposite-sex spouses of ennobled persons. In July 2012, Conservative MP Oliver Colvile announced a private member's bill, titled "Honours (Equality of Titles for Partners) Bill 2012-13", to amend the honours system to both allow husbands of those made dames and for civil partners of recipients to receive honours by their relationship statuses. Another bill, the Equality (Titles) Bill, which would allow for both female first-born descendants to inherit hereditary titles as well as for "husbands and civil partners" of honours recipients "to use equivalent honorary titles to those available to wives", was introduced by Lord Lucas in the House of Lords on 13 May 2013, but did not progress past Committee stage.

On 7 March 2008 Luisa Isabel Álvarez de Toledo, 21st Duchess of Medina Sidonia, a Spanish aristocrat, married Liliana Maria Dahlmann in a civil ceremony on her deathbed. Today, the Dowager Duchess is Liliana Maria.

In 2016, Lord Ivar Mountbatten, a cousin of the then-reigning Queen Elizabeth II, became the first member of the British aristocracy to come out as gay. He married his partner in 2018.

South and Southeast Asia
A significant event in LGBT aristocracy occurred in 2006, when Manvendra Singh Gohil, a prince of the former princely state of Rajpipla in Gujarat, India, came out as gay to Indian media; the event caused controversy both in India and abroad, and his family unsuccessfully attempted to disinherit him.

It was rumored to be an open secret that late Sultan Qaboos of Oman was the only gay ruling monarch, however, his rule did not improve LGBT rights in Oman.

Prince Azim of Brunei was outed in 2019, the year before his death.

List

Note: The following list includes royals and nobles who were recorded as queer or being in queer relationships by reputable sources; those who were only allegedly LGBT are not included on this list.

Ancient Greece 

 Alexander the Great (356-323 BCE, lover of Bagoas and purportedly Hephaestion)

Ancient Rome
 Nero, Roman Emperor (54-68)
 Hadrian, Roman Emperor (76-138, lover of Antinous)
 Elagabalus, Roman Emperor (218-222)
 Constans, Roman Emperor (337-350)

Asia 
China

 Out of the twelve recognized emperors in the Western Han dynasty (the first half of the Han dynasty), ten were recorded as having had at least one male partner. These include:
 Emperor Gaozu of Han (256-195 BCE, lover of Ji Ru)
Emperor Hui of Han (210-188 BCE, lover of Hong Ru)
Emperor Wen of Han (203/202-157 BCE, lover of Deng Tong)
Emperor Jing of Han (188-141 BCE, lover of Zhou Wenren)
Emperor Wu of Han (156-87 BCE, lover of Han Yuan, likely also Wei Qing and Huo Qubin)
Emperor Yuan of Han (75-33 BCE, lover of Hong Gong and Shi Xian)
Emperor Cheng of Han (51-7 BCE, lover of Zhang Fang)
 Emperor Ai of Han (27-1 BCE, lover of Dong Xian)
Emperor Wen of Chen (522-566, lover of Han Zigao)

India
 Babur (1483-1530, lover of Baburi Andijani)
 Manvendra Singh Gohil (1965)
Vietnam
 Lê Tuân (1482-1512), the eldest prince of Lê Hiến Tông 
 Khải Định (1885-1925)
Brunei
Prince Azim of Brunei (1982-2020)

Europe

Austria
 Maria Christina, Duchess of Teschen (1742–1798)
 Archduke Ludwig Viktor of Austria (1842-1919)
 Archduke Ludwig Salvator of Austria (1847-1915)
 Archduke Wilhelm of Austria (1895-1948)
 Count László Almásy de Zsadány (1895-1951)

Bulgaria
 Ferdinand I of Bulgaria (1861-1948)

Denmark
 Prince Valdemar of Denmark (1858-1939)

France
 Henry III of France (1551-1589)
 Louis XIII of France (1601-1643)
 Armand de Gramont, Comte de Guiche (1637-1673)
 Philippe I, Duke of Orléans (1640-1701)
 Philippe, Chevalier de Lorraine (1643-1702)
 Louis Joseph, Duke of Vendôme (1654-1712)
 Prince Eugene of Savoy (1663-1736)
 Jean-Jacques-Régis de Cambacérès, Duke of Parma (1753-1824)
 Hélène van Zuylen, Baroness of Van Zuylen van Nijevelt van de Haar (née de Rothschild, 1863-1947)
 Prince Pierre of Monaco, Duke of Valentinois (1895-1964)

Germany
 Frederick the Great of Prussia (1712-1786)
 Prince Henry of Prussia (1726–1802)
 Charles I of Württemberg (1823-1891)
 Ludwig II of Bavaria (1845-1886)
 Philipp, Prince of Eulenburg (1847-1921)
 Prince Aribert of Anhalt (1866-1933)
 Prince Maximilian of Baden (1867-1929)
 Philipp, Landgrave of Hesse (1896-1980)
 Johannes, 11th Prince of Thurn and Taxis (1926-1990)
 Franz, Duke of Bavaria (1933) (openly gay)
 Prince Egon von Fürstenberg (1946-2004)
 Count Gottfried von Bismarck (1962-2007)

Great Britain
 William II of England (c. 1056-1100)
 Edward II of England (1284-1327)
 James VI and I of Scotland, and of England and Ireland (1566-1625) (see Personal relationships of James VI and I)
 George Villiers, 1st Duke of Buckingham (1592-1628)
 George, 6th Baron Byron (a.k.a. Lord Byron) (1788-1824)
 Francis Douglas, Viscount Drumlanrig (1867-1894)
 Lord Alfred "Bosie" Douglas (1870-1945)
 William Lygon, 7th Earl Beauchamp (1872-1938)
 Evan Morgan, 2nd Viscount Tredegar (1893-1949)
 Robert Boothby, Baron Boothby (1900-1986)
 Prince George, Duke of Kent (1904-1942)
 Edward Douglas-Scott-Montagu, 3rd Baron Montagu of Beaulieu (1926-2015)
 Antony Armstrong-Jones, Earl of Snowdon (1930-2017)
 Sheridan Hamilton-Temple-Blackwood, 5th Marquess of Dufferin and Ava (1938-1988)
 Lord Ivar Mountbatten (born 1963, now openly gay and married)

Greece
 Prince George of Greece and Denmark (1869-1957)
 Prince Paul of Greece, later Paul I of Greece (1901-1964)

Italy
 Pope Julius III (1487-1555)
 Pier Luigi Farnese, Duke of Parma (1503-1547)
 Cardinal Innocenzo Ciocchi Del Monte (1532–1577)
 Cardinal Scipione Borghese (1577-1633)
 Cardinal Stefano Pignatelli (1578-1623)
 Ferdinando II de' Medici, Grand Duke of Tuscany (1610-1670)
 Charles II, Duke of Mantua and Montferrat (1629-1665)
 Gian Gastone de' Medici, Grand Duke of Tuscany (1671-1737)
 Cardinal Henry Benedict Stuart (Henry IX in the Jacobite Succession, 1725-1807)
 Prince Francis Joseph of Braganza (1879-1919)
 Prince Adalberto of Savoy, Duke of Bergamo (1898-1982) 
 Umberto II of Italy (1904-1983)

Netherlands
 William III of England (1650-1702)
 William II of the Netherlands (1792-1849)

Poland
 Frederick I of Württemberg (1754-1816)
 Friedrich Heinrich Albrecht (1874-1940)

Russia
 Grand Duke Konstantin Konstantinovich of Russia (1858-1915)
 Duke Peter Alexandrovich of Oldenburg (1868-1924)
 Prince Felix Felixovich Yusupov (1887-1967)

Spain
 Princess Isabella of Parma (1741-1763)
 Francisco de Asís, Duke of Cádiz (1822-1902)
 Luis Fernando de Orleans y Borbón, Infante of Spain (1888-1945)

Sweden
 Christina, Queen of Sweden (1626-1689)
 Gustav V of Sweden (1858-1950)
 Prince Eugen, Duke of Närke (1865-1947)

In fiction
A recent treatment of LGBT nobles and royalty is the 2002 children's book King & King, which shows the heir to a throne sifting through potential brides before falling in love with, and marrying, another prince before the two become kings. The book was challenged by groups in various countries, and was honored with a variety of accolades from supporters of LGBT rights.

In 2019, Casey McQuiston published their debut novel Red, White & Royal Blue, which focuses on the Prince of England falling in love with the First Son of the United States of America.

In 2021, a series called Young Royals following the life of a Swedish prince who falls in love with another boy was created and aired on Netflix.

References